The Party of Russia's Rebirth ( Partiya Vozrozhdeniya Rossii) is a political party in Russia founded by Gennady Seleznev, former State Duma speaker and a former member of the Communist Party of Russia (2002-2007). The party took the name of the illegal Russian fascist party, which existed in the USSR, and abroad among the Russian expatriates, in the 1930s. Igor Ashurbeyli is the current leader of the party.

In the 2003 legislative elections, the alliance of the Party of Russia's Rebirth and the Russian Party of Life party won 1.9% of the popular vote and no seats on the party list ballot, although Seleznev himself narrowly beat liberal candidate Irina Khakamada in Saint Petersburg to win a seat there.

In the 2007 elections Party of Russia's Rebirth blocked up with another nationalist party, Patriots of Russia, led by Gennady Semigin.

On September 9, 2008, the party was officially dissolved. Many of the members including Gennady Seleznev joined Patriots of Russia.

The party was re-founded in October 2012 and registered once again in May 2013.

On 19 July 2015, the founder and leader of the party Gennady Seleznev died, the acting leader became Viktor Arkhipov. On 26 June 2016, Igor Ashurbeyli was elected the new leader of the party.

During the 2018 local elections, the party nominee Sardana Avksentyeva was elected Mayor of Yakutsk, defeating the candidate from the ruling United Russia party.

References

External links 
Official site (Russian)

2000 establishments in Russia
2008 disestablishments in Russia
2012 establishments in Russia
Democratic socialist parties in Europe
Federalist parties
Left-wing nationalist parties
Nationalist parties in Russia
Political parties disestablished in 2008
Political parties established in 2000
Political parties established in 2012
Registered political parties in Russia
Russian nationalist parties
Socialist parties in Russia